Culleenamore strand is located on the south side of the half-promontory of Strandhill, at the mouth of Ballysadare Bay, Co Sligo, Ireland.

Culleenamore is a diverse animal habitat, and also a seal sanctuary. Horse racing at Culleenamore dates back to the early 1800s, and it is possible the tradition originated much earlier; the surrounding sand hills form a natural grandstand for spectators. The races were annually held, with a few lapses, up until 1954. But in recent decades owing to the popularity of the Culleenamore course, racing has been revived again by the local people.

Early history

The oyster beds at Culleenamore are said to be the oldest in the county and the exquisite oysters were a staple in the diet of the people in the area. Buried under the soil and sand are huge mounds of oyster shells. The sides of some of these banks close to the shore have been worn away to reveal piles of shells antiquarians call Kitchen-middens These remarkable artifacts show that ancient people gathered oysters along the shore at Culleenamore then cooked and ate them at these sheltered spots behind the ‘sandy fields’ thousands of years ago.

Gallery

References

External links
 Go Strandhill - Culleenamore walks
 Ballysadare Bay (Culleenamore) tide times

Beaches of County Sligo